The Agoudas Hakehilos Synagogue (אֲגֻדָּת־הַקְּהִלּוֹת, Union of the communities), at 10 rue Pavée, in the 4th arrondissement of Paris (Le Marais quarter), commonly referred to at the Pavée synagogue, rue Pavée synagogue, or Guimard synagogue, was designed by Art Nouveau architect Hector Guimard and erected between 1913 and 1914.

History 

The synagogue was commissioned by the Agoudas Hakehilos (אֲגֻדָּת־הַקְּהִלּוֹת, union of the communities), society composed of Orthodox Jews of primarily Russian origin, headed by Joseph Landau. Its erection is a testament to the massive wave of immigration from Eastern Europe that took place at the turn of the 20th century. Funded by this wealthy Polish-Russian group it did not cost the Parisian community a centime. They intended to provide a spacious and modernized place for Jews accustomed to the intimate and often squalid shtiblakh.

The construction of the Synagogue started in 1913 and was completed the following year, with the official inauguration taking place on 7 June 1914; nevertheless the Synagogue had been already active for services since October 1913. The opening ceremony was not attended by any of the representants of the Central Consistory, instead famous polish Hazzan Gershon Sirota was present at the event.

During the year in 1934 a gas explosion destroyed the main hall which was rebuilt right after. On the evening of Yom Kippur in 1941, the building was dynamited along with six other Parisian synagogues by collaborators of the nazi occupants; however the bomb did not go off and the building was preserved. On the night between 2 and 3 October of the same year, the synagogue was damaged following an attack organised by far-right association Mouvement Social Révolutionnaire. It was partially restored afterwards, but the main entrance was altered from its original appearance.

The building was registered as a monument historique by the French authorities on July 4, 1989. The synagogue is fully functional today with the Rabbi being Rav Moredekhai Rottenberg, the son of the late Rav Haim Yaakov Rottenberg, known as the Rouv. The synagogue is now open to the public.

Description 
The synagogue is Guimard's last major project before World War I and the only religious building he designed. Built on a narrow stripe of land between older houses, the synagogue is developed in height, with the elongated windows and continuous columns of its façade emphasizing its verticality. The interior is vertically arranged as well, with two levels of galleries on each side of the nave, to deal with the lack of width.

Guimard made use of reinforced concrete for the structure and for the exterior he chose white stone. Light enters through a number of windows in the façade, but much of the natural lighting is provided by the large glass window of the back wall. Skylights originally were also present, but were covered when the roof was renovated; they are still visible from the interior.

The furnishings (luminaires, chandeliers, brackets, and benches) as well as the stylized vegetal decorations made of staff and the cast iron railings are all creations of Guimard and they display the same motifs that characterize the exteriors. The triangle is a recurring symbol in the ornamentation and triangles were also present over the entrances, but were substituted by a single Star of David during a restoration of the façade.

Gallery

Notes

References 

 Paula E. Hyman, 1998. The Jews of Modern France (Jewish Communities in the Modern World) University of California Press. 
 Carol Herselle Krinsky, 1996. Synagogues of Europe: Architecture, History, Meaning Dover Publications.

External links
website

Art Nouveau architecture in Paris
Ashkenazi Jewish culture in Paris
Orthodox synagogues in France
Synagogues in Paris
Art Nouveau synagogues
Le Marais
Monuments historiques of Paris
Works by Hector Guimard
Synagogues completed in 1914
1914 establishments in France
Polish diaspora in Europe
Russian diaspora in France
Russian-Jewish diaspora in Europe
Buildings and structures in the 4th arrondissement of Paris